State Highway 184 (SH 184) is a  long state highway in the southwestern corner of Colorado. SH 184's western terminus is at U.S. Route 491 (US 491) near Lewis, and the eastern terminus is at U.S. Route 160 Business (US 160 Bus.) in Mancos.

Route description
SH 184 begins in the west at its junction with US 491 near Lewis and travels ESE to Mancos. It also intersects US 160 near Mancos, near its eastern terminus at US 160 Bus.

History
The route was established in 1939, when it connected US 160 at Arriola to Mancos. Most of the route was deleted by 1954, leaving approximately nine miles near Mancos. The route was extended to Dolores by 1978, when it was entirely paved.

Major intersections

References

External links

184
Transportation in Montezuma County, Colorado